Miguel Ángel Rubiano Chávez (born 3 October 1984) is a Colombian road bicycle racer, who currently rides for Mexican amateur team Petrolike. During his career, he has competed in five Grand Tours, including four editions of the Giro d'Italia and the 2015 Vuelta a España.

The first win of his career on a Grand Tour came in 2012, on stage 6 of the Giro d'Italia, where he dropped his breakaway companions with 45 kilometers to go and soloed his way to victory with one minute and ten seconds advantage over his nearest competitor.

Major results

2005
 4th Trofeo Internazionale Bastianelli
2006
 1st Mountains classification Regio-Tour
 6th GP Industria & Artigianato di Larciano
 10th Giro dell'Appennino
2007
 8th Giro di Toscana
 8th Tre Valli Varesine
2008
 4th Giro dell'Appennino
 5th Overall Okolo Slovenska
1st Stage 1
 5th Overall Doble Sucre Potosí GP Cemento Fancesa
1st Stage 4
 6th Overall Istrian Spring Trophy
 7th Gran Premio Industria e Commercio Artigianato Carnaghese
 9th Overall Settimana Ciclistica Lombarda
 10th Giro del Medio Brenta
2009
 3rd Trofeo Melinda
 4th Giro della Provincia di Reggio Calabria
 4th Coppa Sabatini
 5th Gran Premio Industria e Commercio Artigianato Carnaghese
 5th Coppa Ugo Agostoni
 6th Giro di Toscana
 6th Giro del Veneto
 8th Giro della Romagna
 10th Giro dell'Appennino
2010
 2nd GP Industria & Artigianato di Larciano
 2nd Trofeo Matteotti
 4th Coppa Ugo Agostoni
 9th Overall Troféu Joaquim Agostinho
 10th GP Kranj
2011
 1st Overall Tour de Hokkaido
1st Stage 4 (ITT)
 2nd Overall Tour de Kumano
 2nd Trofeo Melinda
 3rd Giro di Toscana
 3rd Trofeo Matteotti
 4th Gran Premio Bruno Beghelli
 5th Overall Tour de San Luis
1st Stage 6
 6th Giro della Romagna
 8th Overall Okolo Slovenska
1st Stage 3
 8th Gran Premio Nobili Rubinetterie – Coppa Papà Carlo
 8th Coppa Ugo Agostoni
 9th Gran Premio Città di Camaiore
 9th Tre Valli Varesine
 9th Gran Premio Industria e Commercio Artigianato Carnaghese
 10th Memorial Marco Pantani
2012
 1st  Mountains classification Tour de San Luis
 1st  Mountains classification Settimana Internazionale di Coppi e Bartali
 1st Stage 6 Giro d'Italia
 2nd Trofeo Laigueglia
 2nd Coppa Sabatini
 3rd Prueba Villafranca de Ordizia
 5th Gran Premio di Lugano
 6th Trofeo Matteotti
 8th Gran Premio Industria e Commercio di Prato
 8th Gran Premio Bruno Beghelli
 9th Gran Premio Città di Camaiore
 9th Giro dell'Emilia
 10th Giro dell'Appennino
 10th Memorial Marco Pantani
2013
 2nd Gran Premio Industria e Commercio di Prato
 3rd Overall Settimana Internazionale di Coppi e Bartali
 4th Memorial Marco Pantani
 5th Giro di Toscana
 6th Gran Premio Città di Camaiore
 7th Overall Tour de San Luis
 9th Gran Premio della Costa Etruschi
 9th Coppa Sabatini
 10th Giro dell'Appennino
2014
 1st  Road race, National Road Championships
 3rd Giro dell'Appennino
 9th Coppa Ugo Agostoni
 10th Overall Vuelta a Colombia
2015
 6th Overall Route du Sud
 9th Memorial Marco Pantani
 10th Overall Tour de Luxembourg
  Combativity award Stage 6 Vuelta a España
2016
 1st Stage 1 Tour of Qinghai Lake
2017
 6th Overall Vuelta a Colombia

Grand Tour general classification results timeline

References

External links

1984 births
Living people
Colombian male cyclists
Colombian Giro d'Italia stage winners
Sportspeople from Bogotá